Martin Yves Expérience (born 9 March 1998) is a Haitian professional footballer who plays as a left-back for French  club Cholet. Born in France, he represents the Haiti national team.

Club career
In June 2022, Expérience signed with Cholet.

International career
Expérience debuted with the Haiti national team in a 6–1 2021 CONCACAF Gold Cup qualification win over Saint Vincent and the Grenadines on 2 July 2021.

References

External links
 
 

1998 births
Living people
People from Châteaubriant
Haitian footballers
Haiti international footballers
Haiti youth international footballers
French footballers
French sportspeople of Haitian descent
Association football fullbacks
US Avranches players
SO Cholet players
Championnat National players
Championnat National 3 players
2021 CONCACAF Gold Cup players
Footballers from Loire-Atlantique